Terrance Godfrey Webbe (born 30 April 1969) is a former West Indian cricketer. Webbe was a right-handed batsman who bowled right-arm off break.

In February 2006, Webbe played for the United States Virgin Islands in the 2006 Stanford 20/20, whose matches held official Twenty20 status. He made two appearances in the tournament, in a preliminary round victory against St Maarten and in a first-round defeat against St Vincent and the Grenadines. He later played for the United States Virgin Islands in their second appearance in the Stanford 20/20 in 2008, making two appearances in a preliminary round victory against St Kitts and in a first-round defeat against Antigua and Barbuda. In his four appearances, he scored a total of 12 runs at an average of 6.00 and a high score of 7 not out, while with the ball he took 2 wickets at a bowling average of 36.00 and best figures of 1/20.

References

External links
Terrance Webbe at ESPNcricinfo
Terrance Webbe at CricketArchive

1969 births
United States Virgin Islands cricketers
Living people